Rivers is a census-designated place in Catron County, New Mexico, United States. Its population was 28 as of the 2010 census. The community is located at the confluence of the Tularosa River into the San Francisco River.

Geography

Demographics

Education
It is in the Reserve Independent School District.

References

Census-designated places in New Mexico
Census-designated places in Catron County, New Mexico